Brevibacteriaceae is a family of Actinomycetota bacteria.

References

Micrococcales
Bacteria families